Nazarene may refer to:

 A person from Nazareth

Religion
 Nazarene (sect), a term used for an early Christian sect in first-century Judaism, Nasoraean Mandaeans, and later a sect of Jewish Christians
 Nazarene (title), used to describe people from Nazareth in the New Testament, and a title applied to Jesus
 Apostolic Christian Church (Nazarene), a Christian denomination of the Anabaptist movement
 Church of the Nazarene, a Wesleyan evangelical Christian denomination
 Nazarene fellowship, a Christian group 1873–1881

Other uses
 Nazarene movement, a group of early 19th-century German Romantic painters
 The Nazarene, a 1939 novel by Sholem Asch
 Nazarene, a ship wrecked in 1957

See also

 Nazareth (disambiguation)
 Nazarene University (disambiguation)
 List of Church of the Nazarene schools
 Nazirite, one who voluntarily took a vow described in Numbers 6:1–21 in the bible
 Nasranis, or Saint Thomas Christians, an ethnoreligious group from Kerala, India
 Black Nazarene, a statue of Christ venerated in the Philippines
 Impaled Nazarene, a Finnish metal band